El Semillero is a caserío (hamlet) in the Colonia Department of southwestern Uruguay.

Geography
The hamlet is located on Route 50, halfway between its junction with Route 1 and the small town of Tarariras.

Population
In 2011 El Semillero had a population of 600.
 
Source: Instituto Nacional de Estadística de Uruguay

References

External links
INE map of El Semillero

Populated places in the Colonia Department